The Ulaan Tolgoi mine is a large niobium mine located in central Mongolia. Ulaan Tolgoi represents one of the largest niobium reserves in Mongolia having estimated reserves of 200 million tonnes of ore grading 0.06% niobium.

References 

Niobium mines in Mongolia